Hüseyin Avni Aker Stadium was the former home ground of the Turkish football (soccer) club Trabzonspor. The stadium was built in 1951 with a capacity of 2,500 seats. After several renovations, the capacity was increased to 20,750 in 2008.

External links
 Hüseyin Avni Aker Stadium

References

Football venues in Turkey
Trabzonspor
Sports venues completed in 1951
Süper Lig venues
Sports venues in Trabzon